Amanda Bergman is a Swedish singer-songwriter from Dalarna. She has previously performed and released music under the stage names Idiot Wind (from Bob Dylan's song of the same name) and Hajen.

Career
Karin Amanda Bergman Hollingby began her professional career under the stage name Hajen (Swedish for "the shark") and used the name Idiot Wind from 2010 to 2014.

Bergman is a member and lead-vocalist of the Swedish band Amason with Gustav Ejstes, Pontus Winnberg, Nils Törnqvist and Petter Winnberg. The band released its debut album Sky City in January 2015.

She was previously married to Kristian Matsson, also known as The Tallest Man on Earth and they cooperated on the soundtrack of Swedish director Gorki Glaser-Müller's film En Gång Om Året (Once A Year).

She also provided vocals on the album I Never Learn by Lykke Li.

Her primary instrument is the piano; however, she also plays the accordion at times.

In 2015, she had a hit with "Vintersaga", a cover of a song by Ted Ström, after it was featured in a Volvo car ad. The single was released crediting Amanda Bergman. Her debut album Docks, her first album under her own name, was released on February 26, 2016, on the record label INGRID.

In 2016, Bergman was handpicked to perform at the Polar Music Prize ceremony, celebrating laureates Max Martin and Cecilia Bartoli. She performed the song "Love Me Harder", penned by Max Martin and originally performed by Ariana Grande.

Discography

Solo
 Idiot Wind (EP) (2010) 
 Find The Rhythm In The Noise (limited two-track 7") (2012) (released as Idiot Wind)
 Vintersaga (Single) (2015)
 Falcons (Single) (2016)
 Docks (Album) (2016)
 Flickering Lights (EP) (2016)

With Amason
 Margins (Single) (2013) 
 Went to War (Single) (2013) 
 EP (EP) (2013) 
 Ålen (Single) (2014) 
 Duvan (Single) (2014) 
 Sky City (Album) (2015) 
 Kelly (Single) (2015) 
 Flygplatsen (EP) (2015)

References

Living people
Swedish folk singers
Swedish women singers
Swedish songwriters
Year of birth missing (living people)